"The Happiness of Having You" is a song written by Ted Harris, and recorded by American country music artist Charley Pride.  It was released in November 1975 as the first single and title track from his album The Happiness of Having You.  The song peaked at number 3 on the Billboard Hot Country Singles chart. It also reached number 1 on the RPM Country Tracks chart in Canada.

Chart performance

References

1975 singles
1975 songs
Charley Pride songs
RCA Records singles